The 2022 Saudari Cup was contested between the women's national teams of Singapore and Malaysia from 8 to 10 July 2022. The series consisted of three Women's Twenty20 International (WT20I) matches.

The Saudari Cup is an annual event between the two sides, which started in 2014, with Malaysia winning all of the previous editions, including the most recent edition in 2019.

Malaysia again retained the trophy, with a 3–0 series win over their hosts.

Squads

T20I series

1st WT20I

2nd WT20I

3rd WT20I

References

External links
 Series home at ESPN Cricinfo

Associate international cricket competitions in 2022
International cricket competitions in Singapore
Saudari Cup